Ten Duinen Abbey or the Abbey of the Dunes was a Cistercian monastery at Koksijde in what is now Belgium. It was one of the richest and most influential religious institutions in the medieval County of Flanders. It later relocated to the city of Bruges.

History
A religious community was founded in the dunes near Koksijde by the hermit Ligerius in 1107. In 1120 the community took the Rule of St Benedict as its rule of life, and in 1139 it became affiliated to the Cistercian Order. Partly through donations and partly through land reclamation work in the dunes and polders, the monastery developed extensive landholdings on which the lay brothers reared sheep, producing wool for the cloth trade. A dependent house was established at Eastchurch, in Kent, to export wool from England, but was later sold to Boxley Abbey. The daughter house Ter Doest Abbey was founded in 1175 and also became rich and influential.

New buildings were begun in 1214 and completed in 1237, to house a community of approximately 400 monks and lay brothers. The new church was consecrated by the bishops of Thérouanne and Tournai on 13 October 1262.

The church was vandalised by iconoclasts in 1566, and the monastery was sacked by rebel forces in 1578. The community was scattered but regrouped in 1583. After decades in temporary accommodation the community was established in Bruges in 1627, in a house that had been the refugium of Ter Doest, which had been re-amalgamated to Ten Duinen in 1624. New monastery buildings  were erected in Bruges in the years 1628–1642. Work on a new church was begun in 1775 and completed in 1788.

On 9 April 1796, during the French occupation of Belgium, the abbey was suppressed and its goods confiscated. In 1833 the diocesan seminary of Bruges was established in the former monastic buildings in Bruges. Excavations of the ruins of the medieval buildings in the dunes near Koksijde began in 1897. Several campaigns have been undertaken since, most notably in 1955 and in 1987–88. The ruins are now a museum site.

Abbots

Ligerius
Fulco, 1128–1138
Robert of Bruges, 1138–1153
Alberon, 1153–1155
Idesbald, 1155–1167
Walter van Dickebusch, 1167–1179
Hacket, 1179–1185
Walter van Dickebusch, 1185–1189
Elias of Koksijde, 1189–1203
Petrus, 1203–1215
Amelius, 1215–1221
Gilles de Steene, 1221–1226
Solomon of Ghent, 1226–1232
Nicolas van Belle, 1232–1253
Lambert van Kemmele, 1253–1259
Diederik of Brabant, 1259–1265
Thomas of Ghent, 1265–1277
Willem Cucht, 1277–1280
Johannes of Oostburg, 1280–1299
Jacobus of Biervliet, 1299–1303
Thomas of Aardenburg, 1303–1305
William of Hulst, 1305–1318
Lambert Uppenbrouck of Westouter, 1318–1354
Walter Bredereep of Kaprijke, 1354–1376
Jan Maes of Bassevelde, 1376–1406
Thomas de Corenbytere of Kaprijke, 1406–1418
Peter van der Marct of Hontenesse, 1418–1442
Everard van Overtvelt of Bruges, 1442–1457
Johannes Crabbe, 1457–1488
Pierre Vaillant of Bruges, 1488–1492
Josse de Werere of Bruges, 1492–1495
Christian de Hondt of Bruges, 1495–1509
Jan Terlinck of Ghent, 1509–1515
Pieter Onderberch of Ghent, 1515–1519
Robert le Clercq of Arras, 1519–1559
Antoine Wydoot of St-Omer, 1559–1566
Pierre Helline of Axel, 1566–1575
Robrecht Holman of Sluys, 1575–1579
Laurent van den Berghe of Ingelmunster, 1579–1583–1606
André du Chesne of Ath, 1606–1610
Adrianus Cancellier of Dunkirk, 1610–1623
Bernard Campmans of Douai, 1623–1642
Josse du Corron of Ath, 1642–1649
Bernard Bottyn of Bruges, 1649–1653
Gerard de Baere of Laarne, 1654–1667
Michel Bultynck of Tielt, 1667–1678
Eugeen van de Velde of Bruges, 1678–1680
Martin Colle of Ypres, 1680–1699
Lucas De Vriese of Ypres, 1699–1725
Benedictus van Steenberghe of Ghent, 1725–1729
Bernard van Thienen of Bruges, 1729–1734
Antoine De Blende of Bruges, 1734–1744
Louis de Coninck of Ghent, 1744–1748
Robert van Severen of Bruges, 1748–1792
Maur De Mol of Ghent, 1792–1799

Notable monks
 Jan Sindewint (died 1319), professor of theology at the University of Paris

References

1107 establishments in Europe
1627 establishments in Europe
1797 disestablishments in the Southern Netherlands
Cistercian monasteries in Belgium
Christian monasteries established in the 12th century
County of Flanders